Elections in Johor (formerly Johore) have been held in the Malaysian state of Johor since 1954 and have chosen Johor's elected representatives in the Dewan Rakyat and Dewan Undangan Negeri (the Malaysian federal and state assemblies).

Federal level

Federal constituencies
 List of Malayan federal electoral districts (1955–1959)#Johore
 List of former Malaysian federal electoral districts#Johor
 List of Malaysian electoral districts#Johor

General elections

1955 general election

1959 general election

1964 general election

1969 general election

1974 general election

1978 general election

1982 general election

1986 general election

1990 general election

1995 general election

1999 general election

2004 general election

2008 general election

2013 general election

2018 general election

2022 general election

State level

State constituencies
 List of Malayan state and settlement electoral districts (1954–1959)#Johore
 List of former Malaysian state electoral districts#Johor

State elections

1954 state election

1959 state election

1964 state election

1969 state election

1974 state election

1978 state election

1982 state election

1986 state election

1990 state election

1995 state election

1999 state election

2004 state election

2008 state election

2013 state election

2018 state election

2022 state election

 
Elections in Malaysia